Adhiparasakthi is an Indian Tamil-language mythology soap opera that aired on Raj TV and aired every Friday at 8:00PM IST. The story of this series had depicted the worship of Goddess. In this series, the role of Supreme Goddess was taken up and played by the famous actress Sukanya.

The show producer by Meediya Plus Grijaswami and Chandrakantha, N.J. Arivazhagan and C. Loganathan were the assistant directors of this series. Sri Hari and K.R.S. Kumar were the associate directors. The direction of this devotional series was carried out by Gopi Bheem Singh. The show ended with 41 episodes.

On account of this show's popularity this show is now retelecasted on Raj TV at 6.30PM on weekdays.

Cast
 Sukanya as Adhiparasakthi
 Abitha as Renuka Devi (Episode: 1)
 Sathish
 Master Sridhar
 Kalidass
 Mithran
 Birla Bose as Shivaperuman
 Bhuvaneswari (Episode: 39-41)

Title track
The title track was sung by Manikka Vinayagam and Rajhesh Vaidhya. The lyrics for the track were written by Vaali. The music for this series was composed by Rajhesh Vaidhya.

References

External links
 Raj TV Official Site 

Raj TV television series
Tamil-language mythology soap operas
2009 Tamil-language television series debuts
Tamil-language television shows
2010 Tamil-language television series endings
Indian television series about Hindu deities